4 Compositions for Sextet is an album by English free-jazz drummer Tony Oxley, which was recorded in 1970 and released on CBS. 
The album, the second of a trilogy that Oxley recorded for major labels, features the same band with whom he recorded the previous, The Baptised Traveller, expanded to a sextet with the addition of trombonist Paul Rutherford.

Reception

In his review for AllMusic, Thom Jurek states "The four tunes are all outer-limits numbers; all methadrine takes on what were happening improvisations. It's true that there are loose structures imposed on all four tracks, but they quickly dissolve under the barrage of sonic whackery."

The Penguin Guide to Jazz notes that "Four Compositions was a title guaranteed to offend players and fans who wanted to set aside any implications of predetermined structures."

In his book Honesty Is Explosive!: Selected Music Journalism, music writer Ben Watson claims about the album "It is a stone-cold, drop-dead, ice pick-in-the-forehead masterpiece. It was too much for the marketing department at Columbia, and Oxley was dropped."

Track listing
All compositions by Tony Oxley
 "Saturnalia" – 10:09
 "Scintilla" – 8:56
 "Amass" – 13:00
 "Megaera" – 6:09

Personnel
Evan Parker – tenor sax
Kenny Wheeler – trumpet, flugelhorn 
Paul Rutherford – trombone 
Derek Bailey – guitar 
Jeff Clyne – bass
Tony Oxley – drums

References

1970 albums
Tony Oxley albums
Columbia Records albums